Anya Fernald (1975) is an American entrepreneur, chef, and sustainable agriculture expert based in the San Francisco Bay Area. She founded Live Culture Co., a business and marketing consulting company, the Eat Real Festival Company, and  Belcampo Meat Co., a producer of sustainably sourced meats headquartered in Oakland, California, of which she was founding CEO. She has published a cookbook and appeared as a judge on the Food Network's Iron Chef America, Iron Chef Gauntlet, and The Next Iron Chef.

Early life and education
Fernald was born on a raw-milk dairy farm outside Munich, Germany, while her parents were teaching and researching abroad. When she was 3 years old, her family moved back to the United States, eventually settling in Palo Alto, California, and then Oregon. After graduating from Wesleyan University with a degree in political science, she received a Thomas J. Watson Fellowship, leading to work as an itinerant cheesemaker in Europe and North Africa.

Career

Europe (1999–2005)
From 1999 to 2001, Fernald developed and implemented business and marketing plans for small-scale cheese makers in Sicily for rural development initiative funded by the European Union, CoRFiLaC. She subsequently directed the International Presidia program at Slow Food in Bra, Italy, where until 2005 she devised and instigated an international micro-investment program that managed business planning and marketing for small-scale artisan food producers in countries such as Madagascar, Sweden, Ecuador and Bosnia.

United States (2006–present)
Soon after returning to California in 2006, Fernald founded a produce distribution company connecting high-quality farmers to large institutional buyers, which was later acquired. In 2008 she began working with Alice Waters as executive director of Slow Food Nation to organize and direct a large event to raise the profile of high-quality organic food.

In 2009, Fernald founded the Eat Real Festival Company, which produces an annual, two-day food festival in Oakland, California. This company was acquired in 2015. The festival focuses on food and drinks produced locally, sustainably and organically.

Also in 2009, Fernald founded Live Culture Co., a business and marketing consulting firm. In 2010, the company began working with Todd Robinson to develop a concept to market products from a ranch he owned in Northern California. This consulting engagement resulted in the development of Belcampo, which Fernald and Robinson founded in 2012. Fernald and Robinson also collaborated on a project in Belize, which later became Copal Tree Farms and Lodge.

Belcampo
Fernald co-founded Belcampo Meat Co., an Oakland-based supplier of sustainably-sourced meat. The company operated a 20,000 square foot, USDA-approved multi-species slaughter facility designed by animal welfare expert Temple Grandin, and a nearby  farm, and opened its first store in Marin County in November 2012. It expanded to also include butcher shops and restaurants in Los Angeles, Santa Monica, San Francisco, San Mateo, Oakland, and New York, and also sold meat through Erewhon Grocery Stores. Fernald was CEO until August 2020, when Garry Embleton became co-CEO. The company closed in October 2021 after a former butcher reported that it had sold cuts of meat from other producers, labeled as produced by Belcampo.

Television
Fernald began working as a judge and sustainable food expert on the Food Network's Iron Chef America franchise in 2009, and continued to appear regularly until 2015. She has also appeared on CBS This Morning.

Publications
In spring 2016, Fernald released her debut cookbook, Home Cooked: Essential Recipes for a New Way to Cook, with Ten Speed Press.

Honors
In 2010, Fernald was named one of 40 Big Food Thinkers 40 and Under by Food & Wine magazine, one of the top 100 female founders in INC Magazine, and one of The New York Times' Nifty 50, recognizing America's up-and-coming talent.

Personal life
The couple had a daughter, but  had separated.

References

External links
 Belcampo website

Living people
American food writers
Food Network chefs
American television chefs
American chief executives of food industry companies
Women food writers
American women chief executives
American women chefs
21st-century American women
1975 births